The 1991–92 Borussia Dortmund season was the 80th season in the club's history and the 16th season since promotion from 2. Bundesliga in 1976. Borussia finished second in the league behind VfB Stuttgart.

The club also participated in the DFB-Pokal where it reached the third round, losing 2–3 to Hannover 96.

Competitions

Overview

Bundesliga

League table

Matches

DFB Pokal

Statistics

Squad statistics

|}

References

Borussia Dortmund
Borussia Dortmund seasons